The 1948–49 Polska Liga Hokejowa season was the 14th season of the Polska Liga Hokejowa, the top level of ice hockey in Poland. Four teams participated in the final round, and Ogniwo Kraków won the championship.

Final Tournament

External links
 Season on hockeyarchives.info

Polska
Polska Hokej Liga seasons
1948–49 in Polish ice hockey